Shahid Rafiq Khan (born July 18, 1950) is a Pakistani-American billionaire businessman and sports tycoon. He is the owner of Flex-N-Gate, an American supplier of motor vehicle components.

Khan was featured on the front cover of Forbes magazine in 2012, associating him as the face of the American Dream. As of March 2023, Khan's personal net worth is $12.1 billion. In 2021, he ranked 94th in the Forbes 400 list of richest Americans, and is the 291st richest person in the world. Khan is the richest auto parts magnate ahead of Georg F. W. Schaeffler who has a net worth of $9.1 billion. He is also the wealthiest person of Pakistani origin.

Early life and education 
Khan was born in Lahore, Pakistan, to a middle-class family involved in the construction industry. His mother (now retired) was a professor of mathematics, and his father Rafiq Khan used to have a shop that sold survey and drawing equipment. Shahid Khan also had a brother named Tariq Rafiq Khan, who died in his early 20s.

Khan moved to the United States in 1967 at the age of 16 to study at the University of Illinois at Urbana–Champaign. When he went to the United States, he spent his first night in a $2/night room at the university YMCA, and his first job was washing dishes for $1.20 an hour. He joined the Beta Theta Pi fraternity at the school. He graduated from the Grainger College of Engineering with a BSc in industrial engineering in 1971. He later was awarded the Mechanical Science and Engineering Distinguished Alumni Award in 1999.

Business career

Flex-N-Gate 
Khan worked at the automotive manufacturing company Flex-N-Gate Corporation while attending the University of Illinois. When he graduated he was hired as the engineering director for the company. In 1978, he started Bumper Works, which made car bumpers for customized pickup trucks and body shop repairs. The funds to start the new business included a $50,000 loan from the Small Business Administration and $16,000 of his own savings.

In 1980, he bought Flex-N-Gate from his former employer Charles Gleason Butzow, bringing Bumper Works into the fold. Khan grew the company so that it supplied bumpers for the Big Three automakers. In 1984, he began supplying a small number of bumpers for Toyota pickups. By 1987 it was the sole supplier for Toyota pickups and by 1989 it was the sole supplier for the entire Toyota line in the United States. Adopting The Toyota Way increased company efficiency and ability to change its manufacturing process within a few minutes. Since then, the company has grown from $17 million in sales to an estimated $2 billion in 2010 to $8.89 billion in 2020.

By 2019, Flex-N-Gate had 25,000 employees and 69 manufacturing plants in the United States and China, Argentina, Spain, France, Germany, Mexico and Canada. and in 2020 had a revenue of $8.9 billion and was ranked as the 46th largest privately held American company by Forbes. It is also ranked by Automotive News as the 7th largest American automotive parts supplier and overall 33rd largest supplier in the world.

In May 2012, the Occupational Safety and Health Administration fined Flex-N-Gate $57,000 for health violations at its Urbana plant. Before the 2012 NFL Draft, the United Automobile Workers (UAW) and other environmentalist groups organized a campaign for several accusations against Flex-N-Gate and Khan.

Sports and entertainment

Jacksonville Jaguars 

Khan's first attempt to purchase a National Football League team came on February 11, 2010, when he entered into an agreement to acquire 60% of the then-St. Louis Rams from Chip Rosenbloom and Lucia Rodriguez, subject to approval by other NFL owners. However, Stan Kroenke, the minority shareholder of the Rams, ultimately exercised a clause in his ownership agreement to match any proposed bid.

On November 29, 2011, Khan agreed to purchase the Jacksonville Jaguars from Wayne Weaver and his ownership group subject to NFL approval. Weaver announced his sale of the team to Khan later that same day. The terms of the deal were not immediately disclosed, other than a verbal commitment to keep the team in Jacksonville, Florida. The purchase price was $770 million. The NFL owners unanimously approved the purchase on December 14, 2011. The sale was finalized on January 4, 2012, making Khan the first member of an ethnic minority to own an NFL team.

Khan is a board member of the NFL Foundation.

Khan is one of three NFL team owners born outside of the United States of America, the other two being Kim Pegula of the Buffalo Bills, born in South Korea, and Zygi Wilf of the Minnesota Vikings, born in Germany.

Fulham F.C. 
In July 2013, Khan negotiated the purchase of the London soccer club Fulham F.C. of the Premier League from its previous owner, Mohamed Al Fayed. The deal was finalized on July 12, 2013, with the amount estimated between £150–200 million. An official purchase price for the club was not announced with him stating that it was "highly confidential".

All Elite Wrestling 
In 2019, it was revealed that Shahid Khan and his son, Tony Khan, are the lead investors behind the professional wrestling promotion All Elite Wrestling (AEW). Tony Khan is also the President and CEO of the promotion.

Black News Channel 
Khan was the majority shareholder in Black News Channel throughout the network's two-year existence.

Personal life 

Khan is Muslim. Khan met Ann Carlson (now Ann Carlson Khan) at the University of Illinois in 1967 and dated her for ten years before they married in 1977. They have two children together, a daughter, and a son, Tony Khan, born in 1982. Khan became a naturalized American citizen in 1991.

Khan owns a house in Naples, Florida, and the superyacht Kismet. He also has an apartment in Chicago's Gold Coast neighborhood.

Awards and honors 
Khan has received a number of awards from the University of Illinois, including a Distinguished Alumnus Award in 1999 from the Department of Mechanical Science and Industrial Engineering, the Alumni Award for Distinguished Service in 2006 from the College of Engineering, and (with his wife, Ann Carlson) the Distinguished Service Award in 2005 from the University of Illinois Alumni Association.

See also 

Forbes list of billionaires
Four Seasons Hotel and Residences Toronto
Kismet (yacht)

References

External links 

 Fulham F.C. bio
 Jacksonville Jaguars bio

 
1950 births
Living people
All Elite Wrestling executives
All Elite Wrestling personnel
American billionaires
American people of Pakistani descent
American company founders
American industrial engineers
American manufacturing businesspeople
American Muslims
American soccer chairmen and investors
Businesspeople from Lahore
Corporate executives in the automobile industry
Engineers from Illinois
Fulham F.C. directors and chairmen
Jacksonville Jaguars owners
Naturalized citizens of the United States
Pakistani billionaires
Pakistani company founders
Pakistani emigrants to the United States
Pakistani industrial engineers
People from Urbana, Illinois
Grainger College of Engineering alumni
People from Lahore